Damianos Kattar (born 1960) is a Lebanese economist and academic who served as the Minister of Finance and Economy in 2005 as well as the Minister of Environment and Administrative Reform in 2020.

References 

Lebanese economists
Government ministers of Lebanon
Lebanese academics
1960 births
Living people
Independent politicians in Lebanon